I Love You is the twenty-fourth studio album by American singer Diana Ross. It was released in Europe by Parlophone Records' Angel label in late 2006 and by Manhattan Records in the United States in 2007. It was Ross's first studio album of newly-recorded material since Every Day Is a New Day (1999). The album features a number of classic love songs such as Marvin Gaye's "I Want You" (co-written by Ross's brother Arthur), Burt Bacharach's "The Look of Love" and Queen's "Crazy Little Thing Called Love". The only new original song on the album is the title track "I Love You (That's All That Really Matters)" .

Her highest-charting album in over 20 years in the US, it debuted at number 32 on the Billboard 200 and peaked at number 16 on the US Top R&B/Hip-Hop Albums. I Love You also charted in the Netherlands and the United Kingdom. Critical reception toward the album was generally mixed. A special edition format was also released including a DVD featuring behind the scenes footage of the album's production. In support of the album, Ross embarked on the I Love You Tour which began in April 2007 in the United States and eventually visited Europe and Canada.

Critical reception

Allmusic editor Jeff Tamarkin wrote that "in what might be the least inspired album of her career, iconic diva Diana Ross sleepwalks through a mishmash of seemingly randomly chosen love songs, all covers save for one new composition, adding nothing to them and forcing one to wonder just why she bothered." He found that Ross "puts little emotion or enthusiasm into her recitations here, and seems to have little familiarity with, or understanding of, the songs she and producers Peter Asher and Steve Tyrell have chosen for the album. Her vocals are largely nondescript and at times barely hint at the qualities that made her such a distinctive force for decades, and the arrangements and production are whitewashed and lacking in originality."

Commercial performance
First released internationally, I Love You debuted and peaked at number 60 on the UK Albums Chart. In North America, the album was released on January 16, 2007. It debuted on the US Billboard 200 as the week's Hot Shot Debut, reaching number 32, with first-weeks sales of 21,222 copies. This marked Ross' highest-charting album since Swept Away peaked at number 26 in late 1984. Other charts I Love You  appeared on include the Top R&B/Hip Hop Albums and the Top Internet Albums, reaching number 16 and number 32, respectively. According to Soundscan, as of 2016, the album has sold around 100,000 copies in the United States.

Track listing

Charts

References

2006 albums
Diana Ross albums
Albums produced by Peter Asher